Pseudocreobotra is a genus of Sub-Saharan flower mantises. They are visually similar to Creobroter species of Asia, but belong to different subfamilies. Their forewings have prominent spiralled eyespots, which are flashed in a silent deimatic display, to startle would-be predators. The nymphs however, expand the raised abdomen in response to threats, to reveal a single dorsal eyespot. The species are easily reared in captivity.

Species
The species include:
 Pseudocreobotra amarae Rehn, 1901
 Pseudocreobotra ocellata Beauvois, 1805
 Pseudocreobotra wahlbergi Stål, 1871

See also
 List of mantis genera and species
 Flower mantis

References

Hymenopodidae
Mantodea of Africa
Mantodea genera
Taxa named by Henri Louis Frédéric de Saussure